Horacio de la Peña and Jorge Lozano were the defending champions, but did not participate this year.

Luis Lobo and Javier Sánchez won in the final 5–7, 6–1, 6–4, against Cristian Brandi and Federico Mordegan.

Seeds

Draw

Draw

References
Draw

ATP Athens Open
1994 ATP Tour